Phocaeicola plebeius, formerly Bacteroides plebeius,  is a microbe found in the human gut, most often found in Japan natives. The microbe is believed to have obtained the gene for degradation of porphyran via horizontal gene transfer. The porphyranase encoding gene is believed to have been derived from the microbe Zobellia galactanivorans. Microbes in the gut are responsible for their production of carbohydrate active enzymes or CAZymes. CAZymes are responsible for a variety of functions involving complex carbohydrates such as synthesis, recognition, or metabolism. Moreover, CAZymes are not encoded in the human genome, highlighting the importance of microbes in digestive processes. P. plebeius contains a gene known as BACPLE_01693 which encodes β-porphyranase-A.

Composition of red algae Porphyra 
Porphyra is a genus of red seaweed. The two main Porphyra used in Japanese dishes are P. yezoensis and P. tenera which are commonly used in sushi. Porphyra spp. also known as nori in Japan contains compounds such porphyrans and agaroses that are indigestible to people lacking P. plebius. Rhodophyta, the phylum of red algae, has a cell wall composed of sulfated galactans. Agarans, a main component of the cell wall is composed of alternating 3-linked β-D-galactose and 4-linked α-L-galactose. Porphyran is a water-soluble agaran found in Porphyra. The porphyran backbone is composed of roughly 30% 3-linked β-D-galactose and 4-linked 3,6-anhydro-α-L-galactose. The remaining 70% is composed of 4-linked α-L-galactopyranose-6-sulfate or 3-linked β-D-galactopyranose.

Function of β-Porphyranase-A 
β-Porphyranase-A is a catalytic enzyme that hydrolyzes the (1→4) linkage between β-D-galactopyranose and α-L-galactopyranose-6-sulfate in porphyran. Furthermore it contains a  TIM barrel domain and two β-sandwich domains.

Comparison of β-Porphyranase-B and β-Porphyranase-A 
There is a 35% sequence similarity between β-Porphyranase-B and β-Porphyranase-A.  Furthermore, orthologs between Z. galactanivorans and P. plebeius 1698, a strain of P. plebeius, have a sequence similarity of 48%-69%. Moreover, porphyranase genes in both Z. galactanivorans and P. plebeius are located in similar orders along their chromosome, or are syntenic.

References

External links
Type strain of Bacteroides plebeius at BacDive -  the Bacterial Diversity Metadatabase

Bacteroidia
Gut flora bacteria
Bacteria described in 2005